is a Quasi-National Park on the coast of Okinawa and the Kerama Islands, Japan. It was established as a Prefectural Park in 1965 and re-designated with the return of Okinawa to Japanese administration in 1972.

See also
 List of national parks of Japan
 Okinawa Senseki Quasi-National Park

References

External links
 
  Okinawa Kaigan Quasi-National Park (introduction and maps)

National parks of Japan
Parks and gardens in Okinawa Prefecture
Protected areas established in 1972
1972 establishments in Japan
Itoman, Okinawa